Bjørg Lødøen (7 December 1931 – 5 March 2009) was a Norwegian painter, graphic artist, and composer.

Biography

Lødøen was born in Oslo, Norway. 
In 1945, by way of her father  she came to know the painter Xan Krohn. Krohn had been taking part in the Russian avant-garde movement from about 1910 until he returned to Norway some time after 1917. Krohn was affiliated with a group of artists, Jack of Diamonds, that included Kazimir Malevich, Mikhail Larionov and Natalia Goncharova.

From 1951 until 1954 Lødøen was studying at the Norwegian National Academy of Craft and Art Industry in Oslo, from 1957 until 1961 at the Norwegian National Academy of Fine Arts, with the professor Alexander Schultz. Whilst a student  she spent some time in Paris and Florence, from 1961  she made several study trips throughout Europe. Lødøen is also known for his cooperative work with Rolf Aamot for cinema and television. Her work is on display in several Norwegian and European museums, and can also be found in the U.S. She was awarded the State Life Grant for Artists in 1977.

Selected works

Exhibitions
Kunstnerforbundet ("The Artistsociety"), Oslo 1961, paintings and drawings.
Oslo Kunstforening (Oslo Art Society), Oslo 1966, paintings.
Kunstnernes Hus ("Artists´ House") - Permanenten, Oslo 1973, permanent exhibition-paintings.
Porsgrunn Art Society , 1973, paintings.
Kunstnernes Hus, Oslo 1976, paintings - visual music, in correlation to Rolf Aamot's exhibit.
Bergen Kunsthall (Bergen Art Society), 1994, laser exhibition in correlation to Rolf Aamot's exhibit.
Gallery Bjerke, Oslo 1996.
Oslo City Hall Gallery, (Large scale paintings ), 1999.
Kongsvinger Art Society , 1999, paintings and large watercolors.
Svor Museum, Hornindal, Nordfjord, 2000, large watercolors and paintings.

Paintings and watercolor
Sunflowers in Eclipse (1999)

Television
 "Visual" (1971); Music by Rolf Aamot. Recorded and produced by Bjørg Lødøen and Rolf Aamot.t.
 "Progress" (1977); Music by Rolf Aamot. Recorded and produced by Bjørg Lødøen and Rolf Aamot.
 "Puls" (1986), 3. part; Music by Rolf Aamot. Recorded and produced by Bjørg Lødøen and Rolf Aamot.
 "Medusa" (1986), a composition by Bjørg Lødøen and Rolf Aamot; in which Lødøen is a visual actor.

Cinema
 "Kinetic Energy" (1967–68), Music by Rolf Aamot. Recorded and produced by Bjørg Lødøen and Rolf Aamot.
 "Vision - en film om Gustav Vigeland" (1969); Music by Rolf Aamot. Recorded and produced by Bjørg Lødøen and Rolf Aamot.
 "Structures" (1970); music: Rolf Aamot, Music by Rolf Aamot. Recorded and produced by Bjørg Lødøen and Rolf Aamot.
 "Actio" (1980);  Music by Rolf Aamot. Recorded and produced by Bjørg Lødøen and Rolf Aamot..

References

Literature
 Norsk Kunstnerleksikon, Bind 2 (Norwegian Artist Encyclopedia, Vol. 2), Universitetsforlaget, Oslo.

External links
 Bjørg Lødøens official website
 Rolf Aamot´s official website

1931 births
2009 deaths
20th-century Norwegian painters
21st-century Norwegian painters
Norwegian composers
Oslo National Academy of the Arts alumni
20th-century male artists